Cerro Gordo is a town in Columbus County, North Carolina, United States. The population was 207 at the 2010 census.

History 
Cerro Gordo was incorporated in 1874, taking its name from the 1847 Battle of Cerro Gordo in Mexico.

Geography
Cerro Gordo is located at  (34.322178, -78.928100).

Cerro Gordo, meaning 'fat hill,' describes its slightly higher elevation than the rest of Columbus County, although it is in the coastal plain region of North Carolina. The majority of its land is devoted to crops, cows, and hog houses.

Demographics

As of the census of 2000, there were 244 people, 90 households, and 68 families residing in the town. The population density was 322.8 people per square mile (124.0/km2). There were 102 housing units at an average density of 134.9 per square mile (51.8/km2). The racial makeup of the town was 75.00% White, 18.44% African American, 3.69% Native American, 2.46% Asian, and 0.41% from two or more races. Hispanic or Latino of any race were 2.46% of the population.

There were 90 households, out of which 34.4% had children under the age of 18 living with them, 63.3% were married couples living together, 11.1% had a female householder with no husband present, and 24.4% were non-families. 22.2% of all households were made up of individuals, and 15.6% had someone living alone who was 65 years of age or older. The average household size was 2.71 and the average family size was 3.21.

In the town, the population was spread out, with 27.9% under the age of 18, 7.4% from 18 to 24, 29.1% from 25 to 44, 20.1% from 45 to 64, and 15.6% who were 65 years of age or older. The median age was 36 years. For every 100 females, there were 89.1 males. For every 100 females age 18 and over, there were 81.4 males.

The median income for a household in the town was $20,000, and the median income for a family was $28,750. Males had a median income of $31,964 versus $22,500 for females. The per capita income for the town was $12,447. About 21.7% of families and 22.5% of the population were below the poverty line, including 12.5% of those under the age of eighteen and 14.3% of those 65 or over.

References

Works cited 
 

Towns in North Carolina
Towns in Columbus County, North Carolina